Zhang Lei is a Chinese former international table tennis player.

He won two silver medal's at the 1993 World Table Tennis Championships in the team event and in the men's doubles with Ma Wenge.

See also
 List of table tennis players

References

Table tennis players from Beijing
Living people
Chinese male table tennis players
Asian Games medalists in table tennis
Table tennis players at the 1990 Asian Games
Table tennis players at the 1994 Asian Games
Asian Games gold medalists for China
Asian Games bronze medalists for China
Medalists at the 1990 Asian Games
Medalists at the 1994 Asian Games
World Table Tennis Championships medalists
Year of birth missing (living people)